Henry P. Rusk (1884–1954) was a faculty member at the University of Illinois, United States, in the Department of Animal Husbandry.  He was head of the department from 1922 to 1939 and also served as Dean of the College of Agriculture for 13 years.

He received a B.S. (1908) and M.S. (1911) in Agriculture from the University of Missouri, where he was also a founding member of FarmHouse fraternity in 1905.

Among his numerous accomplishments, Rusk was the chair of President Hoover's Commission on Agriculture from 1948 to 1954. He provided leadership to multiple national, state and local boards and organizations, and also received honorary doctorates from three universities.

References
 Material pulled from the records of FarmHouse International Fraternity, Inc.

University of Illinois faculty
1884 births
1954 deaths
University of Missouri alumni
FarmHouse founders